Ulaan-Uul ( = red mountain) is a sum of Khövsgöl aimag. The area is close to 10,000 km2. In 2000, Ulaan-Uul had a population of 3,726 people, mainly Darkhad. The sum center, officially named Tögöl, is located 171 km north-north-west of Mörön and 942 km from Ulaanbaatar.

History 

The Ulaan-Uul sum was formed from the bigger part of Bayanzürkh sum in 1933. From 1956 to 1990, it was the seat of the Jargalant Amidral negdel.

Economy 

In 2004, there were about 72,000 heads of livestock, among them 23,000 goats, 24,000 sheep, 17,000 cattle, yaks, and khainags, 7,000 horses, and 216 camels.

Interesting Places 

This sum covers the southern part of the Darkhad valley, a basin that is considered remote even by Mongolian standards. The locals practice shamanism, and the Öliin davaa pass that leads to Ulaan - Uul is protected by a famous collection of thirteen ovoos that apparently can be traced back until the 16th century. Both the Delgerkhaan uul and parts of the Ulaan Taiga National Park are located in this sum.

References

Literature 

M. Nyamaa, Khövsgöl aimgiin lavlakh toli, Ulaanbaatar 2001, p. 144f

Districts of Khövsgöl Province